Pauline Sullivan (born 6 September 1963) is an association football player who represented New Zealand at international level.

Sullivan made her Football Ferns début in a 0–2 loss to Taiwan on 7 October 1982, and finished her international career with 13 caps to her credit.

References

1963 births
Living people
New Zealand women's association footballers
New Zealand women's international footballers

Women's association footballers not categorized by position